Personal names in Hong Kong generally contain differences from those in mainland China due to the use of Hong Kong Cantonese language, ethnic diversity, and the presence of English as a second language.

An example of a Hong Kong name in English is Joshua Wong Chi-fung, which uses an "English name + Hong Kong Cantonese Surname + Personal Name" format. The surname is located in the middle of the name, which may be capitalised (WONG Chi-fung). The given name may also be rendered as two words (Wong Chi Fung). According to custom, the Western-style name is in "English name + Surname" format while the Chinese-style is in "Surname + Personal name".

Surname 
Generally, the Cantonese majority employ one or another romanization of Cantonese. However, non-Cantonese immigrants may retain their hometown spelling in English. For example, use of Shanghainese romanization in names (e.g. Joseph Zen Ze-kiun) is more common in Hong Kong English than in official use in Shanghai where Mandarin-based pinyin has been in official use since the 1950s.

Given name 
Chinese names and sometimes Chinese surnames in Hong Kong may be supplemented by or replaced by an English name when using English. The use of English names in Hong Kong is not well researched or documented. English names in Hong Kong can use various proper names and nouns that are not often found in the Western world, with some examples being Rimsky Yuen, York Chow, and Moses Chan. Inspiration for English names in Hong Kong can come from the names of months, sports brands, and luxury labels. More conventional English names can undergo distortion by the adding, substitution, or deletion of letters (e.g. Sonija, Garbie, Kith), as well using suffixes like -son (e.g. Rayson). Others adopt a Western name that sounds similar phonetically to their Chinese name, such as Hacken Lee from Lee Hak-kan. These categories (addition, substitution, phonetic-based, etc.) are the fundamental ways of generating creative Hong Kong names.

Maiden name 
In case a married person uses the spouse's surname, the maiden name is usually placed after that surname. For instance, the 4th Chief Executive of Hong Kong Carrie Lam Cheng Yuet-ngor has Carrie and Yuet-ngor as the English and Cantonese personal names respectively, Cheng as the maiden name, and Lam from the surname of her husband Lam Siu-por. In the Anglo-Saxon world, married women are sometimes referred by "first name + married name" style, which is Carrie Lam in the example above, while locally as "married name + maiden name + personal name" style.

See also
 Origins of names of cities and towns in Hong Kong
 Hongkongers
 Culture of Hong Kong
 Official Cantonese translations of English names for British officials

References

Names by culture
Hong Kong